William Owen Bradley (October 21, 1915 – January 7, 1998) was an American musician and record producer who, along with Chet Atkins, Bob Ferguson, Bill Porter, and Don Law, was one of the chief architects of the 1950s and 1960s Nashville sound in country music and rockabilly.

Before the fame
A native of Westmoreland, Tennessee, United States, Bradley learned piano at an early age, and began playing in local nightclubs and roadhouses when he was a teenager.  At 20, he got a job at WSM-AM radio, where he worked as an arranger and musician.  In 1942, he became the station's musical director, and was also the leader of a sought-after dance band, joined later by vocalists Bob Johnstone and Dottie Dillard, that played well-heeled society parties all over the city. That same year he co-wrote Roy Acuff's hit "Night Train to Memphis". He kept the band up until 1964, although in the intervening decades, his work as a producer would far overshadow his own performing career.

In 1947, Bradley took a position as a music arranger and songwriter at Decca Records.  He worked for Paul Cohen on Castle Studio recording sessions by some of the biggest talents of the day, including Ernest Tubb, Burl Ives, Red Foley and Kitty Wells.  Learning from Cohen, he eventually began to produce records on his own.  When his mentor left the label in 1958, Bradley became vice president of Decca's Nashville division, and began pioneering what would become the "Nashville sound".

The Nashville sound

Country music had long been looked on as unsophisticated and folksy, and was largely confined to listeners in the less affluent small towns of the American South and Appalachia.  In the late 1950s, Bradley's home base of Nashville was positioning itself to be a center of the recording industry, and not just the traditional home of the Grand Ole Opry. Part of what became the Nashville sound, began in a Quonset hut attached to a house Bradley owned with his brother Harold at 804 16th Avenue South in Nashville.

This location, which would come to be informally known as Quonset Hut Studio, is commonly recognized as the birthplace of a more commercial country music that often crossed over into pop. This distinct genre of American music was developed primarily by Owen Bradley's crew of hand picked musicians, including Harold, Grady Martin, Bob Moore, Hank Garland and Buddy Harman, known collectively as Nashville's "A-Team". The success of Bradley's Quonset Hut Studio spurred RCA Victor to build its RCA Studio B.  A handful of other labels soon followed setting up shop on what would eventually become known as Music Row. Bradley and his contemporaries infused hokey melodies, with more refined lyrics, and blended them with a refined pop music sensibility to create the Nashville sound, known later as 'countrypolitan'. Light, easy listening piano (as popularized by Floyd Cramer) replaced the clinky honky-tonk piano (ironically, one of the artists Bradley would record in the 1950s was honky tonk blues singer pianist, Moon Mullican - the Mullican sessions produced by Bradley were experimental in that they merged Moon's original blues style with the emerging Nashville sound stylings). Lush string sections took the place of the mountain fiddle sound; steel guitars and smooth backing vocals rounded out the mix.

Regarding the Nashville sound, Bradley stated, "Now we've cut out the fiddle and steel guitar and added choruses to country music.  But it can't stop there. It always has to keep developing to keep fresh."

Starmaker

The singers Bradley produced made unprecedented headway into radio, and artists such as Kitty Wells, Patsy Cline, Brenda Lee, Loretta Lynn, Lenny Dee, and Conway Twitty became household names. Rock and Roll singers such as Buddy Holly and Gene Vincent also recorded with Bradley in his Nashville studio. Bradley often tried to reinvent older country hitmakers; as previously mentioned, he tried to update Moon Mullican's sound and produced one of Moon's best performances "Early Morning Blues" where the blues and the Nashville sound complement each other surprisingly well. Also, he produced Bill Monroe in both bluegrass and decidedly non-bluegrass settings (Monroe's covers of Jimmie Rodgers' "Caroline Sunshine Girl" and Moon Mullican's "Mighty Pretty Waltz", for example, feature a standard country band rather than bluegrass). Many older artists recognized they needed to change as they saw former pure honky tonk singer, Jim Reeves, blend his own style with the newer styles with great success. However, not everyone was as successful as Reeves or Patsy Cline in these transformations. In addition to his production, Bradley released a handful of instrumentals under his own name, including the minor 1958 hit "Big Guitar". In the late 1950s, Bradley produced a radio and TV series with his brother Harold, Country Style, USA, for distribution to local radio and TV stations as a recruiting tool for the US Army.

Bradley's Barn studio

Bradley sold The Quonset Hut Studio to Columbia Records (which today is a division of Sony Music Entertainment) and bought a farm outside of Nashville (Mt. Juliet, Tennessee) in 1961, converting a barn into a demo studio. Within a few years, the new "Bradley's Barn" became a popular recording venue in country music circles.  The Beau Brummels paid tribute to the studio, through titling their 1968 album Bradley's Barn. The studio burned to the ground in 1980, but Bradley rebuilt it within a few years in the same location.

Later years and honors

Owen Bradley was inducted in 1974 to the Country Music Hall of Fame. He also achieved the distinction of having produced records for more fellow Hall of Fame members (six) than anyone else except Paul Cohen who produced nine. He retired from production in the early 1980s, but continued to work on selected projects.

Canadian artist k.d. lang chose Bradley to produce her acclaimed 1988 album, Shadowland. At the time of his death, he and Harold were producing the album I've Got A Right To Cry for Mandy Barnett, who is best known for her portrayal of Patsy Cline in the original Nashville production of the stage play, Always... Patsy Cline.

His production of Cline's hits such as "Crazy," "I Fall to Pieces" and "Walkin' After Midnight" remain, more than fifty years later, the standard against which female country records are measured today. It is his work with Cline and Loretta Lynn for which he is best known, and when the biopics Coal Miner's Daughter and Sweet Dreams were filmed, Bradley was chosen to direct their soundtracks.

In 1997, the Metro Parks Authority in Nashville dedicated a small public park between 16th Avenue South and Division Street to Owen Bradley, where his bronze likeness sits at a bronze piano. Owen Bradley Park is at the northern end of Music Row. Bradley also has a section of roadway named after him where Bradley's Barn once stood in Mt. Juliet, Tennessee, on Benders Ferry Road.

Bradley's son, Jerry, was inducted into the Country Music Hall of Fame in 2019. His brother Harold was inducted in 2006.

Bradley was inducted into the Musicians Hall of Fame and Museum upon receiving the 2019 Producer Award.

References

Bibliography
Oermann, Robert K. (1998). "Owen Bradley" In The Encyclopedia of Country Music. Paul Kingsbury, Ed. New York: Oxford University Press. pp. 50–51.
Richliano, James Adam (2002). "Angels We Have Heard: The Christmas Song Stories." Star Of Bethlehem Books, Chatham, New York. (Includes interviews with Bradley and chapters on Bradley's involvement in the making of "Jingle Bell Rock", "Rockin' Around The Christmas Tree", and "A Holly Jolly Christmas").

External links
 
Country Music Hall of Fame and Museum

 Owen Bradley recordings at the Discography of American Historical Recordings.

1915 births
1998 deaths
People from Sumner County, Tennessee
Musicians from Nashville, Tennessee
Record producers from Tennessee
Songwriters from Tennessee
American country songwriters
American male songwriters
American music arrangers
Country Music Hall of Fame inductees
Charly Records artists
Decca Records artists
Members of the Country Music Association
20th-century American businesspeople
20th-century male musicians
Coral Records artists